AMSOIL Inc. is an American corporation based in Superior, Wisconsin that primarily formulates and packages synthetic lubricants, fuel additives, and filters. Company founder Albert J. Amatuzio developed several synthetic motor oil formulations throughout the mid-to-late 1960s. He was commercially selling synthetic motor oil by 1968. In 1972, AMSOIL 10W-40 Synthetic Motor Oil became the world's first synthetic motor oil to meet American Petroleum Institute requirements, which prompted the company to adopt "The First in Synthetics®" as its tagline. The company introduced several other synthetic lubricants that represented industry firsts throughout the 1970s and early 1980s. It distributes products in North America via a network of independent dealers paid commissions through a Multi-level marketing (MLM) business model.

History
Albert J. Amatuzio founded AMSOIL Inc. while serving as Squadron Commander of the Duluth, Minn. Air National Guard. Amatuzio was born May 6, 1924, to Italian immigrants in Duluth, Minn. Following high school in 1942, he attended Naval Air Corps training before the Navy closed the program. Amatuzio joined the Merchant Marine prior to joining the Air Force after World War II. He flew the F80 Shooting Star, America's first operational jet fighter. He returned to Duluth to run the family business after his mother had taken ill. In Duluth, Amatuzio joined the Air National Guard. During his fighter-pilot career, Amatuzio won the William Tell Air-to-Air Shootout Competition and the Earl T. Rick Competitive Shootout.

Life-Lube, Inc. 
During his time as a pilot, Amatuzio began researching synthetic engine oils. Synthetic lubricants were used exclusively in jet engines due to the increased heat and stress of supersonic flight, and Amatuzio sought to apply the benefits of synthetic oil to automotive engines. He developed several different synthetic motor oil formulations and was commercially selling synthetic motor oil for automotive use by 1968. On May 23, 1969, he incorporated "Life-Lube, Inc.," through the Minnesota Department of State. By 1970, Amatuzio had renamed his company "AMZOIL," which he later changed to "AMSOIL."

API certification and network marketing 
AMSOIL 10W-40 Synthetic Motor Oil became the first synthetic motor oil in the world to meet American Petroleum Institute (API) service requirements in 1972. The company created its tagline, "The First in Synthetics®," to acknowledge the achievement.
Due to widespread unawareness of synthetic motor oil and consequent slow sales, Amatuzio started the North American AMSOIL Dealer network in 1973. Using network marketing instead of traditional retail sales, AMSOIL Dealers were able to communicate the product's benefits compared to conventional motor oil directly to motorists, helping the company grow.

Recent history 
In 1994, Amatuzio was inducted into the Lubricants World Hall of Fame. Into the 2000s, AMSOIL developed nanofiber materials to be used in oil filters for increased filtration and durability. Nanofiber materials were also developed for air filters, resulting with better performance than traditional cellulose fiber filters. AMSOIL has also developed gear oil for wind turbines, with sale trends increasing through the late 2010s during the increase of renewable energy investments.

Amatuzio died on April 1, 2017. Today, Amatuzio's son, Alan Amatuzio, serves as AMSOIL President & CEO.

AMSOIL divisions

North American dealer 
AMSOIL products are distributed in North America via a network of independent AMSOIL Dealers. They are independent business people and not AMSOIL employees. Dealers earn commissions through a Multi-level marketing (MLM) business model. They also can earn retail profit selling AMSOIL products directly to end-users, such as individual motorists, professional landscapers, truck drivers, and delivery fleets. AMSOIL Dealers also establish retail businesses, such as auto parts stores, repair shops, and oil-change facilities, as retail accounts, where customers can buy AMSOIL products.

Wind-Power companies 
AMSOIL formulates synthetic lubricants for industrial wind turbines. It sells products directly to companies that manufacture wind-turbine components as well as companies that operate wind-turbine farms throughout the world.

International sales 
AMSOIL products are sold in more than 60 countries via International Distributors.

Technical sales 
AMSOIL sells lubricants directly to original equipment manufacturers and large commercial and industrial customers via its Technical Sales division.

Sponsorships

AMSOIL sponsors several motorsports events, race series, motorcycle rallies, professional drivers, and other influencers. Examples include the Sturgis Motorcycle Rally, Championship Off-Road, the Ultimate Callout Challenge, Team O’Neil Rally School, off-road driver Bryce Menzies and many others. AMSOIL also has the naming rights to an ice hockey venue in Duluth, Minnesota, named AMSOIL Arena.

Product line 
AMSOIL manufactures and distributes hundreds of different synthetic lubricants, filters, fuel additives and other products. Typical applications include passenger cars and trucks, heavy-duty equipment, wind turbines, hydraulic applications, motorcycles, marine motors, dirt bikes, snowmobiles, lawnmowers, chainsaws, and other internal-combustion engines.

National and grassroots advertising 
AMSOIL advertises nationally via television, print, and digital mediums on behalf of its North American Dealer network. Dealers and international Distributors also coordinate and execute their own local advertising campaigns to benefit their individual businesses.

Certifications and licenses
NSF-ISR ISO 9001:2015 Certification
NSF-ISR ISO 14001:2015 Certification
API license

References

External links

 

Automotive part retailers
Motor oils
Multi-level marketing companies
American companies established in 1969
1969 establishments in Wisconsin